Mohd Akmal bin Kamaruddin is a Malaysian politician and currently serves as Perak State Executive Councillor.

Election Results

References

Living people
People from Perak
Malaysian people of Malay descent
Malaysian Muslims
Malaysian Islamic Party politicians
Members of the Perak State Legislative Assembly
Perak state executive councillors
21st-century Malaysian politicians
Year of birth missing (living people)